Coconut Water may refer to:

Coconut water, the liquid inside a coconut
"Coconut Water", a song by Milk & Bone from the 2015 album Little Mourning